Moustafa Benshi (born 7 January 2002) is a Syrian professional footballer who plays as an attacking midfielder for Ettan Fotboll club IFK Berga.

Club career
Born in Syria, Benshi emigrated to Sweden with his family in 2015. He joined Kalmar Södra IF the following year. After spending few months at the club, he moved to youth academy of Kalmar FF. He made his senior team debut for the club on 18 August 2021 by scoring a goal in 3–1 cup win against Lunds BK.

International career
In August 2021, Benshi was named in Syria under-23 team squad for a training camp which was held in Amman.

Personal life
Born in Syria, Benshi left the country with his family in 2012 due to Syrian civil war. As a child, he worked in a textile factory in Turkey for an year to meet his family's financial requirements.

Career statistics

Club

References

External links
 
 Profile at SvFF 

2002 births
Living people
Sportspeople from Aleppo
Association football midfielders
Allsvenskan players
Kalmar FF players
Syrian footballers
Syrian expatriate footballers
Expatriate footballers in Sweden
21st-century Syrian people